There have been five or six major ice ages in the history of Earth over the past 3 billion years. 
The Late Cenozoic Ice Age began 34 million years ago, its latest phase being the Quaternary glaciation, in progress since 2.58 million years ago.

Within ice ages, there exist periods of more severe glacial conditions and more temperate conditions, referred to as glacial periods and interglacial periods, respectively.  The Earth is currently in such an interglacial period of the Quaternary glaciation, with the last glacial period of the Quaternary having ended approximately 11,700 years ago.  The current interglacial is known as the Holocene epoch. 
Based on climate proxies, paleoclimatologists study the different climate states originating from glaciation.

Known ice ages

Descriptions

The third ice age, and possibly most severe, is estimated to have occurred from 720 to 635 Ma (million years) ago, in the Neoproterozoic Era, and it has been suggested that it produced a second "Snowball Earth", i.e. a period during which Earth was completely covered in ice. It has also been suggested that the end of that second cold period was responsible for the subsequent Cambrian explosion, a time of rapid diversification of multi-cellular life during the Cambrian Period. The hypothesis is still controversial, though is gaining credence among researchers, as evidence in its favour has mounted.

A minor series of glaciations occurred from 460 to 430 Ma, and there were extensive glaciations from 350 to 289 Ma.

The Late Cenozoic Ice Age has seen extensive ice sheets in Antarctica for the last 34 Ma. During the last 3 Ma, ice sheets have also developed on the northern hemisphere. That phase is known as the Quaternary glaciation, and was marked by more or less extensive glaciation. They first appeared with a dominant frequency of 41,000 years, but after the Mid-Pleistocene Transition that changed to high-amplitude cycles, with an average period of 100,000 years.

Nomenclature of Quaternary glacial cycles 
Whereas the first 30 million years of the Late Cenozoic Ice Age mostly involved Antarctica, the Quaternary has seen numerous ice sheets extending over parts of Europe and North America that are currently populated and easily accessible. Early geologists therefore named apparent sequences of glacial and interglacial periods of the Quaternary Ice Age after characteristic geological features, and these names varied from region to region. The marine record preserves all the past glaciations; the land-based evidence is less complete because successive glaciations may wipe out evidence of their predecessors. Ice cores from continental ice accumulations also provide a complete record, but do not go as far back in time as marine data. Pollen data from lakes and bogs as well as loess profiles provided important land-based correlation data. The names system has mostly been phased out by professionals. It is now more common for researchers to refer to the periods by their marine isotopic stage number.  For example, there are five Pleistocene glacial/interglacial cycles recorded in marine sediments during the last half million years, but only three classic glacials were originally recognized on land during that period (Mindel, Riss and Würm).

Land-based evidence works acceptably well back as far as MIS 6, but it has been difficult to coordinate stages using just land-based evidence before that. Hence, the "names" system is incomplete and the land-based identifications of ice ages previous to that are somewhat conjectural.  Nonetheless, land based data is essentially useful in discussing landforms, and correlating the known marine isotopic stage with them.

Historical nomenclature in the Alps 
 Biber (2.6–1.8 Ma, Gelasian)
 Biber-Danube interglacial (not in use)
 Danube (1.8–1.0 Ma, Calabrian)
 Danube-Gunz interglacial (not in use)
 Günz (1.0–0.4 Ma, MIS 21 – MIS 11 ?)
 Günz-Haslach interglacial (not in use)
 Haslach (seldom used)
 Haslach-Mindel interglacial (not in use)
 Mindel (MIS 12?, MIS 10)
 Mindel-Riss interglacial (MIS 9)
 Riss (MIS 8-6)
 Riss-Würm interglacial (MIS 5e)
 Würm (MIS 5d-2)

Historical nomenclature in Great Britain and Ireland 
 Bramertonian Stage
 Baventian Stage/Pre-Pastonian 
 Pastonian Stage
 Beestonian stage 
 Cromerian Stage (MIS 21-13 ?)
 Anglian Stage (MIS 12, perhaps also MIS 10 ?)
 Hoxnian Stage (MIS 11, perhaps also MIS 9 ?)
 Wolstonian Stage (MIS 8–6, perhaps also MIS 10–9 ?)
 Ipswichian interglacial (MIS 5e)
 Devensian glaciation (MIS 5d-2)
 Flandrian interglacial (MIS 1)

Historical nomenclature in Northern Europe 
 Pre-Tiglian
 Tiglian interglacial
 Eburonian
 Waalian interglacial
 Menapian glacial stage
 Bavelian
 Cromerian complex (MIS 21-13 ?)
 Elster glaciation (MIS 10, perhaps also MIS 12 ?)
 Holstein interglacial (MIS 9 ?)
 Saale glaciation (ended with MIS 6)
 Eem interglacial (MIS 5e)
 Weichsel glaciation (MIS 5d-2)

Historical nomenclature in North America 
 Nebraskan glaciation (replaced by Pre-Illinoian in modern scientific literature)
 Aftonian interglacial (replaced by Pre-Illinoian in modern scientific literature)
 Kansan glaciation (replaced by Pre-Illinoian in modern scientific literature)
 Yarmouthian (stage) (replaced by Pre-Illinoian in modern scientific literature)
 Illinoian stage (MIS 6)
 Sangamonian (MIS 5e, sometimes also 5d-5a)
 Wisconsin glaciation (MIS 4-2, sometimes also 5d-5a)

Historical nomenclature in South America 
 Caracoles (Río Frío) glaciation
 Río Llico (Colegual) glaciation 
 Santa María (Casma) glaciation
 Valdivia interglacial (MIS 5e)
 Llanquihue glaciation (at least MIS 4-2)

Uncertain correlations 
It has proved difficult to correlate the traditional regional names with the global marine and ice core sequences. The indexes of MIS often identify several distinct glaciations that overlap in time with a single traditional regional glaciation. Some modern authors use the traditional regional glacial names to identify such a sequence of glaciations, whereas others replace the word "glaciation" with "complex" to refer to a continuous period of time that also includes warmer stages. As shown in the table below, it is only during the last 200-300 thousand years that the time resolution of the traditional nomenclature allow for clear correspondence with MIS indexes. In particular there has been a lot of controversy regarding the glaciations MIS 10 and MIS 12, and their correspondence to the Elster and Mindel glaciations of Europe.

Sources 
For sources to the tables, see the individual linked articles.

See also 
  (about 780,000 years ago)

References

External links 

 1004 + xv pp. (book downloadable as series of PDF files)
 (Correlation Chart of European Quaternary and cultural stages and fossils)

Ice ages
Glaciation
Glaciology
Paleoclimatology